The Ivchenko-Progress AI-450S is a turboprop engine designed by Ivchenko-Progress and built by Motor Sich. It is a two-shaft design with one gas generator shaft and one free turbine shaft. The 450 hp AI-450S is used on the Diamond DA50-JP7, Bayraktar Akıncı UAV and Diamond Dart 450 and the 630 hp AI-450S-2 is used on the Evektor EV-55. The price of an AI-450 engine is roughly 236,400 dollars.

Specification

See also

References

2010s turboprop engines
AI-450S